300 Winchester Short Magnum (also known as 300 WSM) is a .30 caliber rebated rim bottlenecked centerfire short magnum cartridge that was introduced in 2001 by Winchester.

Specifications

The overall cartridge length is 72.6 mm. The cartridge case length is 53.34 mm. The bullet diameter is .308 in (7.82 mm), which is common to all U.S. .30 caliber cartridges. While providing ballistic performance nearly identical to that of the .300 Winchester Magnum, 300 WSM does this with about 14 grains less powder. The .300 WSM also head-spaces off of the case shoulder, versus the older .300 Winchester Magnum's belted head space design.

The advantage to this round is the ballistic performance is nearly identical to the .300 Winchester Magnum in a lighter rifle with a shorter action burning 8 - 10% less gunpowder.  A disadvantage of cartridge case designs with relatively large case head diameters lies in relatively high bolt thrust levels exerted on the locking mechanism of the employed firearm. 
Also, in small ring actions the larger chamber diameter removes more steel from the barrel tenon, making it weaker radially.

Use
The .300 WSM is adequate for hunting all big game including (but not limited to): moose, black bear, brown bear, elk, mule deer, and white-tailed deer in forests and plains where long range, flat shots are necessary. The .300 WSM is also used in benchrest shooting.

The .300 WSM has a standard bullet diameter of .308 in (7.82 mm) and takes advantage of the numerous bullet options available in that caliber.

Warnings
The 300 WSM is a Delta L problem cartridge, meaning it can present unexpected chambering and/or feeding problems. The Delta L problem article explains this problem in more detail. The .300 Remington Short Action Ultra Magnum has very similar cartridge dimensions but is not interchangeable.

Muzzle velocity
 165 gr (10.69 g) Full Metal Jacket (FMJ): 3,223 ft/s (982 m/s)
 180 gr (11.66 g) Full Metal Jacket (FMJ): 3,095 ft/s (943 m/s)

Comparison

See also
 .300 Remington Short Action Ultra Magnum
 .300 Winchester Magnum
 .300 Ruger Compact Magnum
 Winchester Short Magnum
 List of firearms
 List of rifle cartridges
 Table of handgun and rifle cartridges
 List of individual weapons of the U.S. Armed Forces
 7 mm caliber
 Delta L problem

References

External links 

C.I.P. TDCC datasheet 300 Win. Short Mag.

Pistol and rifle cartridges
Winchester Short Magnum rifle cartridges
Magnum rifle cartridges